This is a list of victory titles assumed by Roman Emperors, not including assumption of the title Imperator (originally itself a victory title); note that the Roman Emperors were not the only persons to assume victory titles (Maximinus Thrax acquired his victory title during the reign of a previous Emperor). In a sense, the Imperial victory titles give an interesting summary of which wars and which adversaries were considered significant by the senior leadership of the Roman Empire, but in some cases more opportunistic motifs play a role, even to the point of glorifying a victory that was by no means a real triumph (but celebrated as one for internal political prestige).

Multiple grants of the same title were distinguished by ordinals, e.g. Germanicus Maximus IV, "great victor in Germania for the fourth time".

List
Quintus Labienus, 40-38 BC
Parthicus imperator: variously interpreted, with latest research suggest the meaning "friend of Parthia"
Publius Ventidius Bassus, 38 BC
 Parthicus, victorious against Parthia (the only non-imperial holder)
Caligula, 37–41
Germanicus ("victorious in Germania"), born with it
Claudius, 41–54
Germanicus ("victorious in Germania"), born with it
Britannicus ("victorious in Britain"), 44
Vitellius, 69
Germanicus ("victorious in Germania"), 69
Domitian, 81–96
Germanicus ("victorious in Germania"), late 83
Nerva, 96-98
Germanicus ("victorious in Germania"), October 97
Trajan, 98–117
Germanicus ("victorious in Germania"), October 97
Dacicus ("victorious in Dacia"), 102
Parthicus ("victorious in Parthia"), 114
Optimus ("Best"), 114
Marcus Aurelius, 161–180
Armeniacus ("victorious in Armenia"), 164
Medicus ("victorious in Media"), 166
Parthicus Maximus ("great victor in Parthia"), 166
Germanicus ("victorious in Germania"), 172
Sarmaticus ("victorious in Sarmatia"), 175
Lucius Verus, 161–169
Armeniacus ("victorious in Armenia"), 164
Parthicus Maximus ("great victor in Parthia"), 165
Medicus ("victorious in Media"), 166
Commodus, 177–192
Germanicus ("victorious in Germania"), 15 October 172
Sarmaticus ("victorious in Sarmatia"), spring 175
Germanicus Maximus ("great victor in Germania"), mid-182
Britannicus, late 184
Septimius Severus, 193–211
Arabicus ("victorious in Arabia"), 195
Adiabenicus (victor of Adiabene"), 195
Parthicus Maximus ("great victor in Parthia"), 198
Britannicus Maximus ("great victor in Britain"), 209 or 210
Caracalla, 198–217
Britannicus Maximus ("great victor in Britain"), 209 or 210
Germanicus Maximus ("great victor in Germania"), 213
Maximinus Thrax, 235–238
Germanicus Maximus ("great victor in Germania"), 235 
Philip the Arab
Germanicus Maximus ("great victor in Germania"), ca 247 
Caspicus Maximus ("great victor of the Carpi") ca 247 
Claudius II, 268–270
Gothicus Maximus ("great victor against the Goths"), 269
Aurelian, 270–275
Germanicus Maximus ("great victor in Germania"), 270 and 271
Gothicus Maximus ("great victor of the Goths"), 271
Parthicus Maximus ("great victor in Parthia"), 273
Tacitus, 275–276
Gothicus Maximus ("great victor of the Goths"), 276
Probus, 276–282
Gothicus (victor of the Goths"), 277
Germanicus Maximus ("great victor in Germania"), 279
Persicus Maximus ("great victor in Persia"), 279
Diocletian, 284–305
Germanicus Maximus ("great victor in Germania"), 285, 287, 288, 293 and 301
Sarmaticus Maximus ("great victor of the Sarmatians"), 285, 289, 294 and 300
Persicus Maximus ("great victor over the Persians"), 295 and 298
Britannicus Maximus ("great victor in Britain"), 297
Carpicus Maximus ("great victor over Carpians"), 297
Armenicus Maximus ("victorious in Armenia"), 298
Medicus Maximus ("great victor in Media"), 298
Adiabenicus Maximus ("great victor in Adiabene"), 298
Maximian, 286–305, 306–308
Germanicus Maximus ("great victor in Germania"), 287, 288, 293 and 301
Sarmaticus Maximus ("great victor of the Sarmatians"), 289, 294 and 300
Persicus Maximus ("great victor over the Persians"), 298
Britannicus Maximus ("great victor in Britain"), 297
Carpicus Maximus ("great victor over Carpians"), 297
Armenicus Maximus ("victorious in Armenia"), 298
Medicus Maximus ("great victor in Media"), 298
Adiabenicus Maximus ("great victor in Adiabene"), 298
Galerius Maximianus, 305–311
Britannicus Maximus ("great victory in Britain"), 297
Carpicus Maximus ("great victor of the Carpians"), six times between 297 and 308
Constantine I, 307–337
Germanicus Maximus ("great victor in Germania"), 307, 308, 314 and 328
Sarmaticus Maximus ("great victor over the Sarmatians"), 323 and 334
 Gothicus Maximus ("great victor over the Goths"), 328 and 332
Dacicus Maximus ("great victor over the Dacian"), 336
Constans, 337–350
Sarmaticus ("victorious over the Sarmatians")
Justinian I, 527–565
Alamannicus ("victorious over the Alamanni"), on accession
Gothicus ("victorious over the Goths"), on accession
Francicus ("victorious over the Franks"), on accession
Anticus ("victorious over the Antae"), on accession
Alanicus ("victorious over the Alans"), on accession
Vandalicus ("victorious over the Vandals"), after the Vandalic War, 534
Africanus ("victorious in Africa"), after the Vandalic War, 534
Maurice, 582–602
Alamannicus ("victorious over the Alamanni")
Gothicus ("victorious over the Goths")
Anticus ("victorious over the Antae")
Alanicus ("victorious over the Alans")
Wandalicus ("victorious over the Vandals")
Erullicus ("victorious over the Heruls")
Gypedicus ("victorious over the Gepids")
Africus ("victorious over the Africans")

Heraclius was the last emperor to use ethnic victory titles before the twelfth century. In 612 he proclaimed himself victor over the Alamanni, Goths, Franks, Germans, Antae, Alans, Vandals, Africans, Heruls and Gepids. Manuel I Komnenos revived the practice in 1166, calling himself Isauricus, Cilicius, Armenicus, Dalmaticus, Ugricus, Bosniacus, Chrobaticus, Lazicus, Ibericus, Bulgaricus, Serbicus, Zikhicus, Azaricus, Gothicus. This was not just classical imitation. There was a legal basis for each of these fourteen claims of victory.

See also
List of Roman Emperors

References

Further reading
McCormick, Michael. Eternal Victory: Triumphal Rulership in Late Antiquity, Byzantium, and the Early Medieval West. Cambridge University Press, 1986.

Ancient Roman names
Ancient Roman titles
Victory titles
Military awards and decorations of ancient Rome
Roman emperors
Lists of names